Bellamya leopoldvillensis is a species of large freshwater snail with a gill and an operculum, an aquatic gastropod mollusc in the family Viviparidae.

This species is endemic to the Democratic Republic of the Congo. It was first described by S. Putzeys in 1898.

References

Viviparidae
Endemic fauna of the Democratic Republic of the Congo
Gastropods described in 1898
Taxonomy articles created by Polbot